Okkervil River is an American rock band led by singer-songwriter Will Sheff. Formed in Austin, Texas, in 1998, the band takes its name from a short story by Russian author Tatyana Tolstaya set on the river Okkervil in Saint Petersburg. They began as a trio made up of Sheff and friends he had met in his native state of New Hampshire but, over time, have gone through many lineups.

Okkervil River self-released their first album, Stars Too Small to Use, which led them to the South by Southwest music festival. After recording their first album in a garage, they signed with Jagjaguwar. They continued by releasing four more albums, including the critically lauded concept album Black Sheep Boy.

After a period of touring for Black Sheep Boy, Okkervil River followed up with The Stage Names. The album sold 10,000 in its opening week in the United States. The group released a free covers album, Golden Opportunities Mixtape from their live performances.

The band has garnered positive critical reception.
They have appeared on the talk show Late Night with Conan O'Brien and have performed with acts such as The Decemberists, The New Pornographers, The National, and Lou Reed.

Okkervil River released the album The Stand Ins in 2008. They promoted the release with a series of cover songs from the album on YouTube by people they've met as a band. Their 2010 collaboration as a backing band with psychedelic rocker Roky Erickson yielded True Love Cast Out All Evil. In 2011, Okkervil River released their sixth full-length album, I Am Very Far, which peaked at No. 32 on the Billboard 200. The band released their seventh album, The Silver Gymnasium, in 2013. The album peaked at No. 66 on the Billboard 200. This was followed by the album, Away, which was released in 2016 on ATO Records. Their ninth album, In the Rainbow Rain, was released by ATO in 2018.

History

Formation 

Okkervil River's founding members became friends at Kimball Union Academy in Meriden, New Hampshire, and after parting ways for college moved to Austin, Texas to live together and start a band. The band consisted of singer-songwriter Will Sheff, Zach Thomas on bass and mandolin, and Seth Warren on drums. Their first gig was at Steamboat in Austin on January 11, 1999.

Bedroom EP and Stars Too Small to Use 
In 1998, the group self-released their first disc, Bedroom EP. Over the course of two weekends in the summer of 1999, they recorded a seven-song self-released album titled Stars Too Small to Use, with recording engineer Jeff Hoskins.

They met Jonathan Meiburg at a gig with his band Whu Gnu at the Waterloo Brewing Company on December 3, 1999. Meiburg subsequently joined the band on accordion and later on pianos and organs.

On the strength of Stars Too Small to Use, Okkervil River was admitted into the 2000 SXSW music festival. Their first major press was a SXSW feature article in the Austin Chronicle on March 3, 2000.

Don't Fall in Love with Everyone You See and Down the River of Golden Dreams 

The band met recording engineer and producer Brian Beattie at their SXSW showcase on March 18, 2000, and soon agreed to make a record together. They spent much of the rest of that year working on Don't Fall in Love with Everyone You See. Warren moved to Berkeley, California in December and was replaced on drums by Mark Pedini.

By the time of that year's SXSW festival, Okkervil River had received interest in their new record from the Bloomington, Indiana-based record label Jagjaguwar. The record was released on Jagjaguwar on January 22, 2002.

One year later the band traveled to San Francisco and reunited with Warren to record their third album at Tiny Telephone with engineer Scott Solter at the console. Jagjaguwar released Down the River of Golden Dreams on September 2, 2003.

In 2003, Pedini left the band to pursue his graphic design work, leaving Okkervil River without a drummer for that year's SXSW. They invited Travis Nelsen, fresh off a tour filling in on drums for sister labelmates Secretly Canadian's Swearing at Motorists, to perform with them. He soon became the band's full-time drummer. The next year, during a long bout of touring, the band added keyboardist and lap-steel player Howard Draper as a fifth member.

Black Sheep Boy, The Stage Names and The Stand Ins 

In August 2004, the band began recording with Beattie again, finally putting the finishing touches on their third full-length album, Black Sheep Boy in November. It was released on April 5, 2005. As a result of the album's critical success, Okkervil River followed up with an EP entitled Black Sheep Boy Appendix on November 22, 2005. This was the first recording with Draper, horn and keyboardist Scott Brackett, guitarist Brian Cassidy, and touring bassist Pat Pestorius, who eventually replaced Zach Thomas in the band. The band signed to Virgin/EMI in Europe and the label re-released Black Sheep Boy and its follow-up Black Sheep Boy Appendix as a double disc on April 28, 2006. Jagjaguwar eventually followed suit, releasing the Definitive Edition with extra songs and videos.

The Stage Names, their fourth full-length studio album (produced again by Beattie), was released on August 7, 2007. The disc features the line-up that toured extensively on Black Sheep Boy and the Black Sheep Boy Appendix, with Cassidy replacing Draper who joined Shearwater. The album was met with critical acclaim and debuted at number 62 on the Billboard 200 with 10,000 copies sold.

Okkervil River released their fifth album The Stand Ins on September 9, 2008. In its first week, the album charted at No. 42 with 11,000 copies sold, according to the Billboard 200. On December 12, 2007, the band freely released a nine-song mixtape entitled Golden Opportunities Mixtape via their website. These recordings, along with the upcoming appendix, are the first to feature contributions from new touring keyboardist, Justin Sherburn, who joined the band in November 2007.

In 2008 guitarist Brian Cassidy stepped down from the band as a full-time touring member and was temporarily replaced by Charles Bissell of The Wrens for their spring and summer tours. Bissell was later replaced by Lauren Gurgiolo, singer and songwriter of the Austin, Texas band The Dialtones. After performing on the Late Show with David Letterman in early 2009, the "Pop Lie" single was released backed with the b-sides "Millionaire" and "Pop Lie (One Man Band Version)".

I Am Very Far & The Silver Gymnasium 

Okkervil River's sixth album, I Am Very Far, was released on May 10, 2011. To promote the album, the band went on tour in 2011 with Titus Andronicus, Julianna Barwick, Future Islands and NewVillager. In September 2013 Okkervil River released their seventh album, The Silver Gymnasium, the content of which is inspired by Sheff's childhood and hometown.

Away 

Away, the band's eighth album, was released on September 9, 2016. The album features a new backing band and sonic direction, including contributions from Marissa Nadler, Jonathan Meiburg and members of the classical group yMusic. The content of the album is largely based on Will Sheff's life during the 2013–2015 period after the release of The Silver Gymnasium, during which many members of the band left and his grandfather died.

In the Rainbow Rain 
In the Rainbow Rain was released on April 27, 2018, and marks the ninth album for the band. Will Sheff produced the album while Shawn Everett (Perfume Genius, Alabama Shakes, The War on Drugs) assumed mixing responsibilities.
The writing process incorporated Sheff's songwriting craftsmanship with an interplay of his new bandmates, Benjamin Lazar Davis (bass), Will Graefe (guitar), Lip Talk (Sarah K. Pedinotti) (keys) and Cully Symington (percussion) – the same iteration of Okkervil River that joined Sheff on the Away tour.

Sheff and the band started work on the new album shortly after the end of that tour – and the presidential election. "If December 2016 was good for anything, it was good for writing songs", he said. Sheff took a different approach to the album, sometimes co-writing with his new band, and occasionally attending local Quaker meetings.

Other projects 

In 2001, Meiburg and Sheff founded a second band known as Shearwater. Originally an outlet for Meiburg songs and some Sheff songs that didn't fit the Okkervil mold, Shearwater has gradually evolved into a full-fledged band. The band's 2006 release, Palo Santo (sans Sheff's vocals, but including his musical input), has seen Meiburg receive great critical acclaim. The groups still share many fans, and, while on tour together in 2004, they released a limited edition split-CD entitled Sham Wedding/Hoax Funeral. In 2008, Meiburg left Okkervil River to focus exclusively on Shearwater.

On April 20, 2010, former 13th Floor Elevators singer-guitarist Roky Erickson released the album True Love Cast Out All Evil, produced by Will Sheff and backed by Okkervil River.

Okkervil River also performed "Candle on the Water" for the 2016 remake of "Pete's Dragon".

Discography

Albums

Split albums 
2003 Julie Doiron / Okkervil River – Acuarela, split with Julie Doiron
2004 Sham Wedding/Hoax Funeral – Jound, split with Shearwater

EPs 
1998 Bedroom EP – Jound
1999 Stars Too Small to Use – Jound
2004 Sleep and Wake-Up Songs – (Jagjaguwar)
2005 Black Sheep Boy Appendix – (Jagjaguwar)
2006 Overboard & Down – Inertia, Australia-only tour EP
2018 New Blood – (ATO Records)

Other 
2007 Black Sheep Boy (Definitive Edition) – Double album of Black Sheep Boy and Black Sheep Boy Appendix (Europe and US, Jagjaguwar)
2007 Golden Opportunities Mixtape – A collection of eight covers and one original song released on the band's website
2010 True Love Cast Out All Evil feat. Roky Erickson (ANTI-)
2011 Golden Opportunities 2 – EP with four covers and one traditional song, released via the band's website
2013 Golden Opportunities 3 – EP with five covers of popular songs from the 1980s
2020 A Dream in the Dark: Two Decades of Okkervil River Live – Live album of twenty-four songs spanning 2006 to 2019

Singles 
1999 "The Velocity of Saul at the Time of His Conversion" – Jound, CD single
2000 "Kansas City Single" – Jound, CD single
2002 "Satisfy You" (split 7-inch with South San Gabriel – Tight Spot, 7-inch
2005 "For Real (There's Nothing Quite Like the Blinding Light)"' – Jagjaguwar, CD single
2006 "The President's Dead"' – Jagjaguwar, 12-inch
2007 "Our Life Is Not a Movie or Maybe" – Jagjaguwar 12-inch
2007 "Unless Its For Kicks" – Jagjaguwar, 12-inch
2008 "Lost Coastlines" – Jagjaguwar, 12-inch
2009 "Pop Lie" b/w "Millionaire" – Jagjaguwar, CD single
2011 "Mermaid" b/w "Walked Out on a Line" – Jagjaguwar, 12-inch vinyl/digital single
2011 "Wake and Be Fine" b/w "Weave Room Blues" – Jagjaguwar, 7-inch vinyl/digital single
2011 "Rider" b/w "I Guess We Lost", – Jagjaguwar 7-inch vinyl/digital single
2011 "Your Past Life As a Blast" b/w "Gold Faces", – Jagjaguwar 7-inch vinyl/digital single
2013 "It Was My Season" ATO digital single
2013 "Down Down The Deep River" ATO digital single
2014 "On A Balcony" ATO digital single
2014 "Where The Spirit Left Us" ATO digital single
2016 "Okkervill River R.I.P." ATO digital single
2016 "The Industry" ATO digital single
2017 "Mary On A Wave" ATO digital single
2017 "Call Yourself Renee" ATO digital single
2018 "Don't Move Back To LA" ATO digital single
2018 "Pull Up The Ribbon" ATO digital single
2018 "Love Somebody" ATO digital single
2018 "Famous Tracheotomies" ATO digital single
2018 "External Actor" ATO digital single

Compilation contributions 
1999 "Omie Wise" (Live) – Aural Fixation: Local Live Vol. 5
2002 "Disfigured Cowboy" – Comes With A Smile CD
2003 "Riot Act" – Glurp / Almost You: The Songs of Elvis Costello
2004 "My Bad Days (Live)" – Comes With A Smile CD
2005 "Nancy (Live)" – I Eat Records / Appetizers & Leftovers
2005 "Your Other Man" – Summersteps Records / Down in a Mirror: A Second Tribute to Jandek
2005 "Westfall (Live)" – Workplay / Workplay Live
2009 "All You Little Suckers" (East River Pipe cover) – Merge Records / Score! 20 Years of Merge Records: The Covers!
2012 "It'll Never Happen Again" (Tim Hardin cover) – Full Time Hobby / Reason To Believe – The Songs Of Tim Hardin
2016 "Candle on the Water" (Helen Reddy cover) – Walt Disney Records / Pete's Dragon (Original Motion Picture Soundtrack)
2017 "Denomination Blues" – Our First 100 Days

Notes

Members 
Drummer Travis Nelsen, who played with the band from 2003 to 2010, died in April 2020.

Timeline

References

External links 

Okkervil River's official YouTube channel
Down The Oubliette – Okkervil River fan site
Okkervil River lyrics and guitar tabs
Okkervil River on NPR Music

American indie folk groups
Indie rock musical groups from Texas
Musical groups from Austin, Texas
Musical groups established in 1998
1998 establishments in Texas
Jagjaguwar artists
Low Transit Industries artists